Innoson Vehicle Manufacturing Co. Ltd. (commonly shortened to IVM) is a Nigerian automobile manufacturer headquartered in Nnewi, Anambra, Nigeria. It was founded by Chief Innocent Chukwuma Nwala. Innoson Vehicle Manufacturing is nicknamed Pride Of African Road.

According to the company, 70% of its car parts are produced locally, while the rest are sourced from Japan, China, and Germany.

Among IVM's vehicle models are the five-seaters Fox (1.5-litre engine) and Umu (2-litre engine) as well as the mini-bus Uzo.

On 20th May, 2022, Innoson presented its first "Keke". Kekes are three-wheeled motor vehicles and the main means of transport in Nigeria. They have so far been imported from the Far East and usually cost about 800,000 Naira or 1,600 Euros. Innoson announced a selling price of 500,000 Naira or 1,000 Euros. The production capacity is 60,000 "Kekes" per year. This is to be increased by a new production plant in Owerri in Imo State on a plot of land of 150,000 square metres. The domestic production of the ubiquitous trikes in Nigeria is expected to have a positive impact on Nigeria's trade balance and labour market.

Products
IVM Caris, compact sedan based on the Forthing Jingyi S50
IVM G20 Smart, compact MPV based on the Keyton EX80
IVM Ikenga, compact MPV based on the Weiwang M60
IVM Capa, MPV based on the Forthing CM7
IVM G5T, mid-size crossover based on the Forthing T5L
IVM G6T, mid-size SUV based on the Foday Landfort
IVM G40, off-road vehicle based on the Beijing BJ40
IVM G80, mid-size SUV based on the Beijing BJ80
IVM Carrier 4WD, mid-size pickup truck based on the Zhongxing Grand Tiger TUV
IVM Granite, mid-size pickup truck based on the Zhongxing Terralord
IVM Mini Bus, microvan based on the Keyton M70

Global Presence

Innoson vehicles are being used in some West African countries like: Mali, Sierra Leone and Ghana.

Brand Ambassador
Mercy Eke, the first female winner of Big Brother Naija, is currently the brand ambassador for Innoson Vehicles.

Innoson New Logo 
A Nigerian Youth Osuolale Farouq was invited by the company CEO Innocent Chukwuma after he re-designed and shared an improved and attracting logo for Innoson Vehicle Manufacturing on Twitter.

Future Plans
On 1st October, 2020 the CEO Innocent Chukwuma Nwala while celebrating Nigeria at 60 spoke about the future of IVM. He said the country is all ready for the world of electric cars and IVM is ready and prepared for that change.

References

External links
 Innoson Vehicles
 Innocent Chuckwuma, ce Nigérian qui a décidé de produire des voitures sur place (Video) 

Companies based in Anambra State
Motor vehicle manufacturers of Nigeria
Nigerian brands